Nima Abu-Wardeh (Arabic: نعمة أبو وردة) is a keynote speaker, creator of online programmes, journalist, columnist and coach.

Her talks focus on Equality and Bias, and the Financial Facts Females Find Out The Hard Way.

Nima was named Ambassador for Women In Construction - the Big 5, and a judge for WomenTech Network.

Education 
She holds MSc in Bio Medial Engineering.

Career 
Her work in the area of behavioural economics led her to creating grass-roots personal finance events. UAE Saves Week , created by Nima, trended in 2013.

She is of Palestinian & Irish descent and was born in the UK. She presented BBC World's business and finance programme, Middle East Business Report for its lifetime and was part of the team that set it up. She has written opinion pieces for Forbes Arabia and has taught media courses at Zayed University in the UAE as a visiting lecturer.

Nima is an Advisory Board Member for the University of Surrey's GSA (Guildford School of Acting), and a former board member of the Arab Thought Foundation, and the World Congress of History Producers.

References

External links
BBC Middle East Business Report bio page
Nima Abu-Wardeh's personal blog

Year of birth missing (living people)
Living people
British people of Palestinian descent
BBC newsreaders and journalists
BBC World News